Cry to Me is the second studio album recorded by American singer Loleatta Holloway, released in 1975 on the Aware label.

Chart performance
The album peaked at No. 47 on the US R&B albums chart. The title track peaked at No. 10 on the Billboard Hot Soul Singles chart and No. 68 on the Hot 100. Another single, "I Know Where You're Coming From", peaked at No. 69 on the Hot Soul Singles chart. Two other singles, "H•e•l•p M•e M•y L•o•r•d" and "Casanova", were released and failed to chart.

Track listing

Production
Floyd Smith – producer
Milan Bogdan – engineer & mastering
Ruby Mazur – album design 
Nick Rietz – photography

Charts

Singles

References

External links 
 

1975 albums
Loleatta Holloway albums